Shouchangoceras  is  a genus of goniatitid pseudohaloritid ammonoids and is the type genus for the pseudohaloritid subfamily Shouchangoceratinae.  The genus is characterized by a compressed shell as much as 5 cm in diameter, with a strongly constricted mature peristome that has shallow dorsolateral sinus, a moderately deep rounded ventral sinus, but without conspicuous lappets, and ornamented by moderately strong transverse ribs and numerous stronger longitudinal lirae, producing a weakly reticulate pattern. Lobes are attenuate. The siphuncle is within the dorsal septal flecture.

Shouchangoceras is known from the Upper Permian of Texas and south China. It is the only genus named and described by Zhao & Zheng known also from North America.

Shouchangoceras resembles both Shangraoceras and Sangzhites in ornament, all three of which possess transverse ribs and longitudinal lirae. In Shouchangoceras both are moderately developed. In Shangraoceras lirae are fine, if found at all, while ribs are course. In Sangzhites both ribs and lirae and strongly developed .

References
Frest, T.J, B.F Glenister and W.M Furnish; 1981. Pennsylvanian-Permian Cheiloceratacean Ammonoid Families Maximitidae and Pseudohaloritidae. Memoir 11, the Paleontological Society; Jour Paleo V. 55, May 1981, supplement.
Zhao, J. K.  and Zheng, Z. G.. 1977. The Permian ammonoids from Zhejiang and Jiangxi. Acta Palaeontologica Sinica 16:217-252.
Shouchangoceras in Paleobiology db.

Shouchangoceratinae 
Permian cephalopods
Permian animals of Asia
Goniatitida genera